Big Bend Rural School is a historic one-room school building located near Steelville, Crawford County, Missouri. It was built in 1893, and is a one-story, rectangular frame building on a native sandstone foundation.  It measures 20 feet by 25 feet and has a gable roof.  Big Bend School closed in 1949 and is owned by the Crawford County Historical Society.

It was listed on the National Register of Historic Places in 1978.

References

One-room schoolhouses in Missouri
School buildings on the National Register of Historic Places in Missouri
School buildings completed in 1893
Buildings and structures in Crawford County, Missouri
National Register of Historic Places in Crawford County, Missouri